Mary E. Bradley Lane (July 3, 1844, St Mary's, Ohio – January 6, 1930, Hamilton County, Ohio) was an American feminist science fiction teacher and author. She was one of the first women to have published a science fiction novel in the United States, first as a serial in a Cincinnati newspaper. 

This novel, Mizora: A Prophecy, was first published in 1880, and has remained remarkable for the radicalism of the feminist utopia presented, against 19th century societal norms. She published a second novel in 1895, entitled Escanaba, which however remains lost.

Works 
 Mizora, Syracuse University Press; New edition (May 1, 2000) 
 Escanaba

References 

American science fiction writers
American women writers
1844 births
1930 deaths